Escom or ESCOM may refer to:
 Escom AG, a defunct German computer corporation
 Escom LLC, Internet corporation
 ESCOM IPN, the Superior School of Computer Sciences of the National Polytechnic Institute of Mexico
 École supérieure de chimie organique et minérale, a French grande école for chemical engineering
 Eskom, South African electricity public utility, known as ESCOM until 1986
 Electricity Supply Commission of Malawi (ESCOM), Ltd, state-owned power producing company in Malawi
 European Society for the Cognitive Sciences of Music, non-profit learned society supporting research in the cognitive sciences of music